The 1922 New Hampshire gubernatorial election was held on November 7, 1922. Democratic nominee Fred H. Brown defeated Republican nominee Windsor H. Goodnow with 53.28% of the vote. Brown became the first Democrat elected Governor since 1912.

General election

Candidates
Fred H. Brown, Democratic
Windsor H. Goodnow, Republican

Results

References

1922
New Hampshire
Gubernatorial